is the fourth compilation album by Japanese idol duo Wink, released by Polystar on February 25, 1995. The two-disc album covers the duo's B-sides from 1988 to 1994.

The album peaked at No. 93 on Oricon's albums chart and sold over 4,000 copies, becoming their lowest-selling album.

Track listing

Charts

Footnotes

References

External links 
 

1995 compilation albums
Wink (duo) compilation albums
Japanese-language compilation albums